The myriagram is a former French and metric unit of mass equal to 10,000 grams (myriad being the Greek word for ten thousand).

In 1975, the United States, having previously authorized use of the myriagram in 1866, declared the term no longer acceptable.

See also
 myria-
 History of the International System of Units

References

Units of mass